Alles Door Oefening Den Haag (Dutch pronunciation: [ˈɑləs doːr ˈufənɪŋ dɛn ˈɦaːx]), commonly known by the abbreviated name ADO Den Haag [ˈaːdoː dɛn ˈɦaːx], is a Dutch [association football] club from the city of The Hague.  During the 2015-16 campaign they competed in the Eredivisie and KNVB Beker competitions.

Competitions

Eredivisie

League table

Results by matchday

Matches
These are the matches scheduled for ADO Den Haag in the 2015-2016 Eredivisie season.

KNVB Beker

Matches

Player details

|}

Sources: Squad numbers, Eredivisie en KNVB Cup stats,

Transfers

In:

Out:

Sources: Transfers 2015-16

References

External links
Official website of ADO Den Haag 
Groen Geel Hart 
ADOFans.nl 
ADO formations at football-lineups.com 
northside fanside 
ADO for EXPATS | ADO Den Haag news, match reports, photo's and ticket info all in English for the Expat Community 

ADO Den Haag seasons
Ado Den Haag